Cindy Mackey (born April 2, 1961) is an American professional golfer who played on the LPGA Tour. She also played under her maiden name, Cindy Pleger, before her marriage in 1984.

Mackey won once on the LPGA Tour in 1986.

Amateur wins
This list may be incomplete.
1982 Canadian Women's Amateur

Professional wins

LPGA Tour wins (1)

References

American female golfers
Georgia Bulldogs women's golfers
LPGA Tour golfers
Golfers from Georgia (U.S. state)
Sportspeople from Athens, Georgia
1961 births
Living people